Sandy Cross is an unincorporated community in Oglethorpe County, in the U.S. state of Georgia. A variant spelling is "Sandycross".

History
A post office called Sandy Cross was established in 1867, and remained in operation until 1900. Sandy Cross was so named for their sandy soil at this crossroads community.

References

Unincorporated communities in Georgia (U.S. state)
Unincorporated communities in Oglethorpe County, Georgia